Don Sturdy is a fictional character in the Don Sturdy series of 15 American children's adventure novels published between 1925 and 1935 by Grosset & Dunlap. The books were written by Victor Appleton, a house name used by the Stratemeyer Syndicate. They were illustrated by Walter S. Rogers. The actual writer for all but one of the books was John W. Duffield. The remaining book, Don Sturdy In The Land Of Giants, or, Captives Of the Savage Patagonians (1930), was written by Howard Roger Garis.

Grosset & Dunlap bound the book series in cloth-over-board covers, and the series continued to be sold in the United States until at least 1940.

This series appears to be the second Stratemeyer Syndicate series' to be reprinted outside the United States, where it was originally published; the first series book being the first book in the Ted Scott series. An exact date of first printing is unknown, as the earlier copy of Big Snake Hunters doesn't have a printing or copyright date inside. Only two Don Sturdy titles were printed in Britain (the other being The Desert of Mystery). Two British forms of The Big Snake Hunters are known to exist, both printed by The Children's Press. One is from the 1930s and another with different cover art from 1953.

The 15 books in the Don Sturdy series were originally published in the following order:
 01 - Don Sturdy On The Desert Of Mystery, or Autoing In The Land Of Caravans, illustrated by Walter S. Rogers, 1925, Grosset & Dunlap, New York
 02 - Don Sturdy With The Big Snake Hunters, or Lost in the Jungle of the Amazon, illustrated by Walter S. Rogers, 1925, Grosset & Dunlap, New York
 03 - Don Sturdy In The Tombs Of Gold, or The Old Egyptian's Great Secret, illustrated by Walter S. Rogers, 1925, Grosset & Dunlap, New York
 04 - Don Sturdy Across The North Pole, or Cast Away in the Land of Ice, illustrated by Walter S. Rogers, 1925, Grosset & Dunlap, New York
 05 - Don Sturdy In The Land Of Volcanoes, or The Trail of the Ten Thousand Smokes, illustrated by Walter S. Rogers, 1925, Grosset & Dunlap, New York
 06 - Don Sturdy In The Port Of Lost Ships, or Adrift in the Sargasso Sea, illustrated by Walter S. Rogers, 1926, Grosset & Dunlap, New York
 07 - Don Sturdy Among The Gorillas, or Adrift in the Great Jungle, illustrated by Walter S. Rogers, 1927, Grosset & Dunlap, New York
 08 - Don Sturdy Captured By Head Hunters, or Adrift in the Wilds of Borneo, illustrated by Walter S. Rogers, 1928, Grosset & Dunlap, New York
 09 - Don Sturdy In Lion Land, or The Strange Clearing in the Jungle, illustrated by Walter S. Rogers, 1929, Grosset & Dunlap, New York
 10 - Don Sturdy In The Land Of Giants, or Captives of the Savage Patagonians, illustrated by Walter S. Rogers, 1930, Grosset & Dunlap, New York
 11 - Don Sturdy On The Ocean Bottom, or The Strange Cruise of the Phantom, illustrated by Walter S. Rogers, 1931, Grosset & Dunlap, New York
 12 - Don Sturdy In The Temples Of Fear, or Destined for a Strange Sacrifice, illustrated by Nat Falk, 1932, Grosset & Dunlap, New York
 13 - Don Sturdy Lost In Glacier Bay, or The Mystery of the Moving Totem Poles, illustrated by Nat Falk, 1933, Grosset & Dunlap, New York
 14 - Don Sturdy Trapped In The Flaming Wilderness, or Unearthing Secrets in Central Asia, illustrated by Nat Falk, 1934, Grosset & Dunlap, New York
 15 - Don Sturdy With The Harpoon Hunters, or The Strange Cruise of the Whaling Ship, illustrated by Nat Falk, 1935, Grosset & Dunlap, New York

References

External links
Don Sturdy In the Tombs of Gold at Gutenberg 

Book series introduced in 1925
Sturdy
Sturdy
Sturdy, Don
Juvenile series
Stratemeyer Syndicate
Sturdy, Don
Sturdy, Don